Hot Country Songs is a chart that ranks the top-performing country music songs in the United States, published by Billboard magazine.  In 1984, 50 different singles topped the chart, then published under the title Hot Country Singles, in 52 issues of the magazine, based on playlists submitted by country music radio stations and sales reports submitted by stores.

Six acts tied for the most number ones in 1984, with three each: bands Alabama and Exile and soloists Earl Thomas Conley, Merle Haggard, Ricky Skaggs and George Strait.  One of the only two songs to spend more than a single week at number one was a collaboration between Julio Iglesias and Willie Nelson.  Iglesias had been successful in his native Spain and other Latin markets since the late 1960s, but his 1984 album 1100 Bel Air Place was his United States breakthrough.  The album featured duets with American singers from a range of genres, and the first single to be taken from it, "To All the Girls I've Loved Before", paired Iglesias with veteran country singer Nelson.  The song was a top 10 hit on the all-genres Billboard Hot 100 but went all the way to number one on the country chart.  The only other multi-week chart-topper in 1984 was "Why Not Me" by mother-daughter duo The Judds, which ended the year at number one.

The Nitty Gritty Dirt Band had its first number one in 1984.  The band had been active since the 1960s and released a number of acclaimed albums in the 1970s before shortening its name to simply Dirt Band and taking a mainstream pop music approach.  Soon after reverting to its original name and switching back to country music, the band finally achieved its first Hot Country chart-topper with "Long Hard Road (The Sharecropper's Dream)".    Another act to reach number one for the first time in 1984 after a lengthy chart career was Eddy Raven, who claimed the top spot in June with "I Got Mexico", more than ten years after his first appearance on the Hot Country Singles chart in early 1974.  He would go on to have a total of six number one singles before his success tailed off in the late 1980s.  Exile also topped the country chart for the first time in 1984; the band had topped the Hot 100 six years earlier for four weeks with the disco-influenced pop track "Kiss You All Over", but went on to achieve much greater success after a shift to the country genre in the early 1980s.

Chart history

See also
 1984 in music
 List of artists who reached number one on the U.S. country chart

References

1984
1984 record charts
Country